Elísa Viðarsdóttir (born 26 May 1991) is an Icelandic footballer who plays as a defender in the Úrvalsdeild for Valur and the Iceland women's national football team. She is the younger sister of Margrét Lára Viðarsdóttir, Iceland's record goalscorer. Like Margrét Lára, she began her career with Úrvalsdeild club ÍBV.

Club career
She has played for ÍBV since 2007 with her first league match coming in 2008.

Kristianstads DFF, the Swedish club where Margrét Lára was playing, gave a trial to Elísa before the start of their 2013 Damallsvenskan season. During Elísa's visit she played in a pre-season friendly but Kristianstads had no immediate plans to sign her to a contract. She eventually transferred to Kristianstads in January 2014, by which time Margrét Lára had gone on maternity leave.

In November 2015, she returned to play in the Úrvalsdeild when she signed a contract with Valur.

International career
Elísa's senior international debut came at the 2012 Algarve Cup, in a 1–0 defeat to Germany.

She was called up to be part of the national team for the UEFA Women's Euro 2013.

Honours

Club
ÍBV
Runner-up
 Úrvalsdeild: 2012

References

External links
 
 
 
 
 
 Elísa Vidarsdóttir at fussballtransfers.com 
 Elisa Vidarsdottir at soccerdonna.de 

1995 births
Living people
Elisa Vidarsdottir
Elisa Vidarsdottir
Kristianstads DFF players
Damallsvenskan players
Elisa Vidarsdottir
Expatriate women's footballers in Sweden
Elisa Vidarsdottir
Elisa Vidarsdottir
Elisa Vidarsdottir
Women's association football forwards
Elisa Vidarsdottir
UEFA Women's Euro 2022 players